Eupithecia sagittata is a moth in the family Geometridae. It is found in South Africa and Zimbabwe.

References

Moths described in 1897
sagittata
Moths of Africa